Eduardo Rergis Borja (born 31 December 1980) is a Mexican former professional footballer. Currently he leads the Real Oviedo youth system.

Career
Rergis began his football career in Mexico, playing for Club Atlas before two knee injuries sidelined him for six months at the end of 2009. In July 2010, he returned to playing with Primera B Nacional side Instituto.

Personal
Rergis Borja is the son of Eduardo Rergis, a former Mexican football player and manager.

References

External links
 
 
 

1980 births
Living people
Mexico international footballers
Mexican expatriate footballers
Mexican footballers
Atlas F.C. footballers
Atlante F.C. footballers
C.F. Pachuca players
Tigres UANL footballers
Footballers from Mexico City
Instituto footballers
Club León footballers
Expatriate footballers in Argentina
Association football defenders